The following lists events that have happened in 1896 in the Qajar dynasty.

Incumbents
 Monarch: Naser al-Din Shah Qajar (until May 1), Mozaffar al-Din Shah Qajar (starting May 1)

Events
 Mozaffar ad-Din Shah Qajar ascends to the throne in May 1896 after the assassination of Naser al-Din Shah.

Death
 May 1 – Naser al-Din Shah Qajar is assassinated by Mirza Reza Kermani when he was visiting and praying in the shrine of Shah-Abdol-Azim.

References

 
Iran
Years of the 19th century in Iran
1890s in Iran
Iran